Orawankara Neelakandhan Namboodiri (1857-1917) was a renowned scholar and poet from Kerala, South India.

Early life
Neelakandhan Namboodiri was born in 1857 in Nambudiri Oravankara Illam in Annamanada, Thrissur district. He received his initial training in Sanskrit from his father, but, at the age of 17 he left to study in Kodungalloor under Vidwan Kunhirama Varma.

Literature
Many of Neelakandhan's poems were lost, and only those written after 1882 are available. The majority of them are devotional which are scholarly and pregnant with philosophy. His important works include Baalopadesam, Kuchela Vritham (Ottanthullal), Varadopaakhyaanam, Bhaimee Parinayam (drama), Deveemaahaatmyam, Azhakapuri Varnanam, Ambika Vinisati.

See also
Malayalam Literature

References
http://www.namboothiri.com/articles/malayalam-literature.htm

Malayalam-language writers
1857 births
1917 deaths